The Admirable Crichton is a 1950 British TV adaptation of the 1902 play The Admirable Crichton by J. M. Barrie. It was directed and produced by Royston Morley. It stars Raymond Huntley.

Cast
Raymond Huntley as Crichton
Jean Compton as Lady Catherine Lasenby
Joan Hopkins as Lady Mary Lasenby
Alvys Maben as Lady Agatha Lasenby
David Markham as Hon. Ernest Woolley
Harcourt Williams as Earl of Loam
Geoffrey Wearing as Reverend John Treherne
Richard Carr as Monsieur Fleury

References

External links
Admirable Crichton at Memorable TV
The Admirable Crichton at IMDb
The Admirable Crichton at BFI

British television plays
1950s television plays